Daniel A. Dombrowski (born 1953) is an American philosopher and professor emeritus of philosophy at Seattle University. He was the president of the Metaphysical Society of America (2018–19).

Career

Dombrowski has authored twenty books and over 170 articles in scholarly journals in philosophy, theology, classics, and literature. Among his books are Rethinking the Ontological Argument: A Neoclassical Theistic Perspective (Cambridge: Cambridge University Press, 2006) and Contemporary Athletics and Ancient Greek Ideals (Chicago: University of Chicago Press, 2009).

His main areas of intellectual interest are history of philosophy, philosophy of religion (from a neoclassical or process perspective), political philosopher John Rawls, Christian ethics and pacifism. He is the editor of the journal Process Studies. Dombrowski is considered an expert on the philosophy of Charles Hartshorne. In 2016, he was described as "the most important and prolific Hartshornean today".

Animal rights and vegetarianism

Dombrowski has authored several books dealing with the topics of animal rights and vegetarianism, including The Philosophy of Vegetarianism, published in 1984. It documents the arguments for vegetarianism from Pythagoras through the Hellenistic period to the modern debates on vegetarianism. It was positively reviewed as an "extremely well documented work".

Dombrowski's Babies and Beasts: The Argument from Marginal Cases, published in 1997 is the first book-length examination of the range of views relating to the argument from marginal cases. The book cites the arguments of Peter Singer, Tom Regan, H. J. McCloskey, Jan Narveson, John Rawls, R. G. Frey, Peter Carruthers, Michael P. T. Leahy, Robert Nozick, and James Rachels.

Selected publications

Plato's Philosophy of History (Washington, DC: University Press of America, 1981), 217 pp.
The Philosophy of Vegetarianism (Amherst: University of Massachusetts Press, 1984), 188 pp.  Also Vegetarianism: The Philosophy Behind the Ethical Diet (London: Thorsons, 1985), 188 pp.  Foreword by Peter Singer.
Thoreau the Platonist (NY, Berne, and Frankfurt: Verlag Peter Lang, 1986), 219 pp.
Hartshorne and the Metaphysics of Animal Rights (Albany: State University of New York Press, 1988), 159 pp.
Christian Pacifism (Philadelphia: Temple University Press, 1991), 181 pp.
St. John of the Cross: An Appreciation (Albany: State University of New York Press, 1992), 219 pp.
Analytic Theism, Hartshorne, and the Concept of God (Albany: State University of New York Press, 1996), 247 pp.
Babies and Beasts: The Argument from Marginal Cases (Champaign: University of Illinois Press, 1997), 221 pp.
Kazantzakis and God (Albany: State University of New York Press, 1997), 193 pp.
A Brief, Liberal, Catholic Defense of Abortion, with Robert Deltete (Champaign: University of Illinois Press, 2000), 158 pp.
Not Even a Sparrow Falls: The Philosophy of Stephen R. L. Clark (East Lansing: Michigan State University Press, 2000), 366 pp.
Rawls and Religion: The Case for Political Liberalism (Albany: State University of New York Press, 2001), 192 pp.
Divine Beauty: The Aesthetics of Charles Hartshorne (Nashville: Vanderbilt University Press, 2004), 230 pp.
A Platonic Philosophy of Religion: A Process Perspective (Albany: State University of New York Press, 2005), 152 pp.
Rethinking the Ontological Argument: A Neoclassical Theistic Perspective (Cambridge: Cambridge University Press, 2006), 172 pp.
Contemporary Athletics and Ancient Greek Ideals (Chicago: University of Chicago Press, 2009), 167 pp.
Rawlsian Explorations in Religion and Applied Philosophy (University Park: Pennsylvania State University Press, 2011), 138 pp.
A History of the Concept of God: A Process Approach (Albany: State University of New York Press, 2016), 273 pp.
Whitehead's Religious Thought: From Mechanism to Organism, From Force to Persuasion (Albany: State University of New York Press, 2017), 184 pp.
Process Philosophy and Political Liberalism: Rawls, Whitehead, Hartshorne (Edinburgh: Edinburgh University Press, 2019), 214 pp.

References

External links
Daniel Dombrowski's web page at Seattle University

1953 births
20th-century American philosophers
21st-century American philosophers
American animal rights scholars
American Christian pacifists
American ethicists
American philosophy academics
American Roman Catholic religious writers
American vegetarianism activists
Christian ethicists
Historians of vegetarianism
Living people
Philosophers of religion
Presidents of the Metaphysical Society of America
Process theologians
Seattle University faculty